Purpuradusta is a genus of sea snails, marine gastropod mollusks in the subfamily Erroneinae of the family Cypraeidae, the cowries.

Species
Species within the genus Purpuradusta include:
Purpuradusta barbieri (Raybaudi Massilia, L., 1986) 
Purpuradusta fimbriata (Gmelin, 1791)
Purpuradusta gracilis (Gaskoin, 1849)
Purpuradusta hammondae 
Purpuradusta hammondae hammondae (Iredale, 1939) 
Purpuradusta hammondae raysummersi Schilder, 1960 
Purpuradusta hammondae dampierensis  Schilder, M. & W.O. Cernohorsky, 1965  
Purpuradusta lacrimalis Monterosato  
Purpuradusta microdon (Gray, 1828)
Purpuradusta minoridens (Melvill, 1901) 
Purpuradusta oryzaeformis Lorenz & Sterba, 1999 the Roce-grain cowry
Purpuradusta quisquiliara (Watson, 1886) 
Purpuradusta serrulifera (Schilder & M. Schilder, 1938)  ;Synonyms:
 Purpuradusta durbanensis (Schilder & Schilder, 1938): synonym of Purpuradusta fimbriata fimbriata (Gmelin, 1791)

References

External links
 Iredale, T. (1939). Australian Cowries: Part II. Australian Zoologist. 9(3): 297-323, 3 pl.
 Gofas, S.; Le Renard, J.; Bouchet, P. (2001). Mollusca. in: Costello, M.J. et al. (eds), European Register of Marine Species: a check-list of the marine species in Europe and a bibliography of guides to their identification. Patrimoines Naturels. 50: 180-213

Cypraeidae